Circle Oaks is an unincorporated community in the hills to the northeast of the Napa Valley. Created in 1964, this wildland interface has thrived since, growing into a small country community outside of a bustling valley.  The land layout is purported to have been Frank Lloyd Wright's, the area consists of 1/4 acre lots that are perfect circles; the areas ("triangles") among the circles are considered to be "greenbelt" and cannot be built upon; these greenbelt areas are managed by the Circle Oaks Homes Association.

References
Declaration of Covenants, Conditions And Restrictions OF Circle Oakes Homes Association

External links 
 

Unincorporated communities in California
Unincorporated communities in Napa County, California